Jüri Saar (born 21 October 1956) is an Estonian politician. He was a member of XIII Riigikogu.

References

Living people
1956 births
Isamaa politicians
Estonian Free Party politicians
Members of the Riigikogu, 2015–2019
Place of birth missing (living people)
University of Tartu alumni